Goldfields Giants is an NBL1 West club based in Kalgoorlie, Western Australia. The club fields a team in both the Men's and Women's NBL1 West. The team is affiliated with Kalgoorlie-Boulder Basketball Association (KBBA), the major administrative basketball organisation in the region. The Giants play their home games at Niels Hansen Basketball Stadium.

Team history

SBL
The Goldfields Giants, a men's basketball team, entered the State Basketball League (SBL) in 1990. The Giants' initial coaching staff included Head Coach Randal Hulme and his assistant Ned Coten. Americans Calvin Earl and Paul Graham were the team's first import players, while Keith Malcolm served as the first team captain. Mark Griffin joined the team mid-season as a replacement for the outgoing Graham. The Giants finished their inaugural season in 12th place with a 7–19 record.

In 1995, the Giants had their best season to date, as they finished the regular season in third place with a 19–7 record and advanced through to their first ever SBL Grand Final. In the SBL's only best-of-three grand final series, the Giants were defeated 2–0 by the Bunbury City Slammers.

In 2004, the Giants set a new franchise-best campaign, as they finished the regular season in second place with a 20–4 record. They went on to advance through to the SBL Grand Final, where they lost 104–97 to the Perry Lakes Hawks.

In 2006, the Giants had their best-ever regular season, as they finished in second place with a 21–3 record. They went on to advance through to the SBL Grand Final, where they lost 83–66 to the Lakeside Lightning.

In 2007, the Giants returned to the SBL Grand Final after finishing the regular season in second place with a 17–7 record. In the championship decider at Perry Lakes Basketball Stadium on 8 September, the Giants won their maiden SBL Championship with a 96–94 victory over the Lakeside Lightning. All five Giants' starters scored in double figures, with import Ty Shaw recording 17 points and 18 rebounds and Grand Final MVP Shamus Ballantyne recording 18 points, six rebounds and six assists.

In 2008, the Giants finished the regular season in third place with a 19–7 record and advanced through to their fourth grand final in five years. In the championship decider at Perry Lakes Basketball Stadium on 6 September, the Giants defeated the Willetton Tigers 101–82 to claim back-to-back championships. Darnell Dialls was named Grand Final MVP for his 32 points and 16 rebounds.

In 2009, the Giants finished in second place with a 21–5 record and returned to the semi-finals, but without injured captain Shamus Ballantyne—the match-winning point guard in the previous two playoff campaigns—the Giants lost in straight sets to the Perry Lakes Hawks.

In 2015, behind the trio of Jay Bowie, Jacob Holmen and Mathiang Muo, the Giants returned to the semi-finals for the first time since 2009, despite finishing the regular season in seventh place with a 14–12 record.

NBL1 West
In 2021, the SBL was rebranded as NBL1 West.

In August 2021, a Goldfields Giants women's team was approved for entry into the NBL1 West for 2022.

Notable past men's players

 Atem Kuol Atem
 Shamus Ballantyne
 Jay Bowie
 Jimmy Bowler
 Wayne Chapman
 Wayne Creek
 Darnell Dialls
/ Calvin Earl
 Todd Earle
 Mike Elliott
 Jerry Everett
 Paul Graham
/ Ty Harrelson
 Michael Haney
 Mark Heron
 Brent Hobba
 Jacob Holmen
 Ryan Hulme
 Matthew Leske
/ Adrian Majstrovich
 Kenny Manigault
 Randy Miegel
 Mathiang Muo
 Marcus Taylor
 Donald Whiteside
 Leon Williamson

Accolades
Women
Championships: Nil
Grand Final appearances: Nil
Minor premierships: Nil

Men
Championships: 2 (2007, 2008)
Grand Final appearances: 5 (1995, 2004, 2006, 2007, 2008)
Minor premierships: Nil

References

External links
Official team website
"In a far-flung mining town, its basketball team has an unlikely but welcome boost: American players" at abc.net.au

1990 establishments in Australia
Basketball teams established in 1990
Basketball teams in Western Australia
City of Kalgoorlie–Boulder
NBL1 West teams